Marandallah (also spelled Marandalah and Marandala) is a town in central Ivory Coast. It is a sub-prefecture of Mankono Department in Béré Region, Woroba District.

Marandallah was a commune until March 2012, when it became one of 1126 communes nationwide that were abolished.

In 2014, the population of the sub-prefecture of Marandallah was 36,074.

Villages
Bobosso-Tiénigbé (8 732)
Borozomba (430)
Brokodallan (1 274)
Dandougou (3 087)
Diédougou (486)
Dikodougou (1 008)
Farakoro (3 043)
Kankanazo (300)
Kouassidougou (1 216)
Kougbèré (1 199)
Kpesso (2 917)
Marandalah (3 083)
N'gbankoundougou (416)
Niankabi-Satama-Tabakoro (304)
Nonkoundougou (1 042)
Ouérébo (392)
Sanankoro (2 521)
Souanso (604)
Téguépé (2 854)
Tiassédougou (426)
Tioumoudougou (740)

Notes

Sub-prefectures of Béré Region
Former communes of Ivory Coast